Parrot's sign (after Dr Jules Marie Parrot, 1839–1883) is an indicator of meningitis. It is the creation of pain with applied pressure to the retromandibular region of the head. According to one source, it may be a pupillary reflex elicited by skin pinch.

References

Medical signs